Empress Zhou (周皇后) may refer to:

 Empress Zhou (Former Shu) (given name unknown) (died 918), Chinese empress of the Former Shu state
 Empress Zhou (Ming Dynasty) (given name unknown) (died 1644), Chinese empress of the Ming Dynasty

See also
Empress Dowager Zhou (died 1504), Chinese empress dowager of the Ming Dynasty
Queen Zhou (disambiguation)

Zhou